The flag of the Organization of Turkic States, formerly the flag of the Turkic Council, was adopted at its 2nd Summit, which took place in Bishkek on 23 August 2012 and officially raised on 12 October 2012.

The flag combines the symbols of the original four members: the light blue color of the flag of Kazakhstan, the sun of the flag of Kyrgyzstan, the star of the flag of Azerbaijan and the crescent of the Turkish flag.

See also
Organization of Turkic States

References

Flags of international organizations
Flags introduced in 2012